Sjur Robert Nilsen (born 3 December 1967) is a Norwegian professional ice hockey head coach, currently serving as the head coach of Sparta Warriors of the GET-ligaen.

In his player career, he played for clubs Lillehammer, Sparta Warriors and EC Bad Nauheim. He also played for the Norwegian national ice hockey team.

He has also been assistant coach of the  Norwegian national team, as well as head coach of Storhamar and Swedish club  Leksand.

References

External links

1967 births
Living people
People from Sarpsborg
Norwegian ice hockey players
Lillehammer IK players
Rote Teufel Bad Nauheim players
Sparta Warriors players
Norwegian ice hockey coaches
Norwegian expatriate ice hockey people
Norwegian expatriate sportspeople in Germany
Norwegian expatriate sportspeople in Sweden
Sportspeople from Viken (county)